Robert Law (c. 1788–1874) was a British Army officer.

Robert Law may also refer to:
Bobby Law (born 1965), Scottish footballer
Bob Law (1934–2004), artist
Robert Adger Law (1879–1961), American Shakespeare scholar and professor
Robert D. Law (1944–1969), United States Medal of Honor recipient
Robert Law (1870-1930), was a Scottish-born assayer and metallurgist in Australia